Karin Agneta Engström (born 25 May 1971) is a Swedish Olympic sailor. She finished 9th in the 470 event at the 2000 Summer Olympics together with Lena Carlsson.

References

External links
 
 
 
 

1971 births
Living people
Swedish female sailors (sport)
Olympic sailors of Sweden
Sailors at the 2000 Summer Olympics – 470
470 class sailors
Royal Gothenburg Yacht Club sailors